The Sunnmøre Practical Agricultural Society ( was a patriotic and non-profit association with the goal of developing business and agriculture in Norway's Sunnmøre district. The society was established on November 2, 1773 by Melchior Falch in the village of Borgund. Falch and the priest Hans Strøm supported the initiative. The founding meeting was also attended by other officials and leading people at Sunnmøre, and several others joined later.

The society was inspired by the Royal Danish  Agricultural Society, and among other things it promoted farmers' awards for useful measures and carried out educational work on improving agriculture and other industries in the district. The society was one of the first of its kind in Norway, and it provided a model for similar associations elsewhere in the country. For example, in 1778 the society awarded prizes of 10 rix-dollars for stone livestock buildings, eight rix-dollars for newly tilled land, six rix-dollars for shooting six adult wolves, and five rix-dollars for potato cultivation. Melchior Falch himself operated a model farm in Borgund. The society stagnated when Falch and Strøm left Sunnmøre in 1779, but efforts by Andreas Landmark revived the society's activities around 1802. Work in the society came to a complete standstill in 1816 for reasons that are not clear. The society was probably absorbed into the Royal Norwegian Welfare Society (Det Kongelige Selskap for Norges Vel). The Norwegian Welfare Society was established in 1809 with its own district committee for Sunnmøre, and this district committee contained the same persons (the provost Peter Daniel Baade, the magistrate Ole Severin Kildal, and the bailiff Andreas Landmark) as the leadership of the agricultural society.

Members
Those present at the founding meeting:
 Melchior Falch, magistrate
 Peder Nerem, provost
 Schieldrop, lieutenant
 Christian Meldal, priest
 Johannes Brun, priest (half-brother of Johan Nordahl Brun)
 Peder Finde Astrup from Spjelkavik
 Jens Lindorph, customs official
 Arnoldus Heide, merchant
 Andreas Luth, merchant
 Nils Hagerup, merchant
 Johannes Boldt, merchant
 Jochum C. Rode, merchant
 Ole Honningdal, merchant

Members that joined later:
 Sivert Aarflot, editor
 Ole Alsing, bailiff in Sunnmøre
 Nicolai Astrup (1748–1802), priest
 Johan Christopher Haar Daae, priest
 Claus Frimann, priest
 Christian F. Hagerup, provost, son of Eiler Hansen Hagerup
 Ole Sevrin Kildal, magistrate
 Joachim de Knagenhielm, county governor
 Ludolf Krohn, priest
 Andreas Landmark, bailiff
 Nils L. Landmark, magistrate and politician
 Ludvig Pontoppidan, priest, son of Erik Pontoppidan
 Carl Rønneberg, businessman
 Peter Frederik Suhm, historian
 Laurits Weidemann, official

Honorary members:
 Peter Daniel Baade, provost 
 Johan Lausen Bull, jurist
 Ole Christian Bull, bailiff, poet
 Hilmar Meincke Krohg, county governor, representative at the Norwegian Constitutional Assembly
 Christian Ditlev Frederik Reventlow, count, minister
 Ole Hannibal Sommerfeldt, county governor

References

Non-profit organisations based in Norway
1773 establishments in Norway